Aleksandr Ivanovich Fomichyov (born 7 January 1979) is a Russian professional football coach and a former player. He is the manager of FC Dynamo Bryansk.

Club career
He played eight seasons in the Russian Football National League for FC Dynamo Bryansk, FC Sodovik Sterlitamak and FC Metallurg Lipetsk.

References

External links
 

1979 births
Sportspeople from Bryansk
Living people
Russian footballers
Association football midfielders
FC Metallurg Lipetsk players
FC Sodovik Sterlitamak players
FC Kristall Smolensk players
FC Dynamo Bryansk players
Russian football managers